Nandeshwar Lake is situated in the city of Udaipur in the Indian state of Rajasthan. It is an artificial lake named after the Nandeshwar Mahadev Temple.

References 

Lakes of Udaipur